Augusta is an unincorporated community in central Hampshire County, West Virginia, United States. It is located along the Northwestern Turnpike (U.S. Route 50) at the northern terminus of Augusta-Ford Hill Road (County Route 7) between Shanks and Pleasant Dale, east of Romney. According to the 2000 census, the Augusta community has a population of 4,728.

Historic site 
 French's Mill (1911), Augusta-Ford Hill Road (CR 7)

References

External links

Unincorporated communities in Hampshire County, West Virginia
Northwestern Turnpike
Unincorporated communities in West Virginia